St Mary's College Rugby Football Club is a rugby union club based in South Dublin, Ireland, playing in Division 1B of the All-Ireland League. The club was founded in 1900 by former pupils of St. Mary's College, Dublin and was originally known as Old St Mary's. They club won the Leinster Senior Cup for the first time in 1958. In 2000 they won the AIB League for the first time under the captaincy of Trevor Brennan.
 
The club was formerly sited at College Drive, Templeogue from 1955 until the 1970s, including clubhouse and grounds which have since been developed as Fortfield Square apartments. In the 1970s, the club moved to Templeville Road to rugby grounds formerly owned and used by Templeogue College, the Holy Ghost Fathers sister school of St Mary's College.

Honours
All Ireland League
1999-00, 2011-12:  2
All-Ireland Cup
1974-75: 1
 Leinster Senior League
1972, 1978, 1980, 1989:  4
Leinster Senior Cup
1958, 1969, 1971, 1974, 1975, 1987, 1993, 1995, 2005, 2010, 2013 :  11
Leinster Junior Challenge Cup
1905, 1907, 1908, 1911:  4

Notable players

Ireland
The following St Mary's players represented Ireland at full international level.

Caelan Doris

MEN:

1970 Sean Lynch (17)      		1970 Denis J. Hickie (6)
1972 *John Moloney (27)		        1972 *Tom Grace (25)
1974 *Shay Deering (8)			1977 Tom Feighery (2)
1978 Tony Ward (19)			1978 Terry Kennedy (14)
1979 *Ciaran Fitzgerald (26)**		1979 Rodney O’Donnell (5)
1981 Paul Dean (32)			1988 Vincent Cunningham (16)
1996 Victor Costello (39)			1997 Denis A. Hickie (62)
1997 Conor McGuinness (14)		1997 Kevin Nowlan (3)
1997 John McWeeney (1)		1997 Malcolm O’Kelly (92)
1998 Trevor Brennan (10)		2000 Peter McKenna (1)
2001 Emmet Byrne (9)			2002 Keith Gleeson (27)
2003 Mark McHugh (1)			2005 Kieran Lewis (3)
2007 Shane Jennings (13)		2009 Johnny Sexton (45)
2009 Kevin McLaughlin (8)		2010 Rhys Ruddock (3)
2011 Sean Cronin (35) 			2013 Jack McGrath (10)
2013 James Bourke (0)

Had the distinction of captaining Ireland. 
Captain of Triple Crown winning teams in 1982 and 1985

Ireland 7s
The following St Mary’s players have represented the Ireland national rugby sevens team:
 Terry Kennedy

British & Irish Lions
As well as representing Ireland, the following St Mary's players have also represented the British & Irish Lions.

References

External links
St Mary's College RFC's Official website
St. Mary's College RFC on Facebook
St. Mary's College RFC on Twitter
AIB League Div 1A Info

 
Irish rugby union teams
Rugby union clubs in South Dublin (county)
Rugby clubs established in 1900
University and college rugby union clubs in Ireland
Templeogue
Senior Irish rugby clubs (Leinster)